Qələbin (also, Kalabin, Kalyabin, and Khalabin) is a village and municipality in the Lerik Rayon of Azerbaijan.  It has a population of 330.

References 

Populated places in Lerik District